This is a list of supernova candidates, or stars that astronomers have suggested are supernova progenitors. Type II supernova progenitors include stars with at least 10 solar masses that are in the final stages of their evolution. Prominent examples of stars in this mass range include Antares, Spica, Gamma Velorum, Mu Cephei, and members of the Quintuplet Cluster. Type Ia supernova progenitors are white dwarf stars that are close to the Chandrasekhar limit of about 1.44 solar masses and are accreting matter from a binary companion star. The list includes massive Wolf–Rayet stars, which may become Type Ib/Ic supernovae.

References

Supernovae